William Atcheson Traill (1844 – 5 July 1933) was an Irish engineer. Born at Ballylough, in County Antrim, William Atcheson Traill was educated in private schools and graduated from Trinity College Dublin with a degree in Engineering in 1865 and a Master's in 1873. In 1868 he joined the Geological Survey of Ireland, becoming an expert on water supply. In 1881 he left, and with his brother Anthony he founded the Portrush, Bushmills, and Giant's Causeway Railway and Tramway Company. This operated the world's first electrical railway, and was funded by capital raised from friends and investors including Sir Walter Siemens and Lord Kelvin. Traill devised and patented a conduit system of burying the live rail in a pipe with electrical contact. The expected goods trade never took off, and the line remained until its closure 1949 as a summer tourist railway. In February 1887 he ran in a by-election in North Antrim as an Independent Unionist, coming in third. He married three times, and met his third wife, Nora Woodhouse, in 1895 when he rescued her from drowning.

In 1990, the Northern Bank issued a banknote bearing a portrait of Traill.

References

External links
 Northern Ireland £5 banknote (1990) showing William Traill

Alumni of Trinity College Dublin
Irish people in rail transport
Irish railway mechanical engineers
People from County Antrim
1844 births
1933 deaths